Diego César de Oliveira, commonly known as Diego Fumaça, is a Brazilian footballer who plays as a midfielder for Atlético Goianiense.

Career
Diego Fumaça spent his early years playing in the lower divisions of Campeonato Mineiro. He represented Araxá and Valeriodoce, won the Modulo II with Patrocinense in 2017 and won the 2nd division with Ipatinga, also in 2017. In 2019 he competed in Campeonato Goiano with Goiânia, and earned himself a transfer to Atlético Goianiense on 15 April 2019. He made his national league debut for Atlético Goianiense in the Campeonato Brasileiro Série B match against Vitória on 26 May 2019, coming on as a late substitute in the 1–1 draw.

References

External links
 

Living people
1994 births
Brazilian footballers
Association football midfielders
Araxá Esporte Clube players
Valeriodoce Esporte Clube players
Ipatinga Futebol Clube players
Goiânia Esporte Clube players
Atlético Clube Goianiense players
Campeonato Brasileiro Série B players